The 2016–17 Football Superleague of Kosovo season, also known as the Vala Superleague of Kosovo for sponsorship reasons is the 18th season of top-tier football in Kosovo. The season began on 19 August 2016 and concluded on 28 May 2017; the relegation play-offs will follow. Feronikeli are the defending champions.

A total of 12 teams are competing in the league: 10 sides from the 2015–16 season and two promoted from the Liga e Parë.

The 2016–17 season will be the first full season that the Football Federation of Kosovo will be a member of FIFA and UEFA. Qualification for the UEFA Champions League will be determined at the end of the season, pending re-evaluation of the league's adherence to UEFA Financial Fair Play Regulations and stadium standards.

On 9 May 2017, Trepça'89 defeated Besa 2–0 away from home to clinch their first league title. Trepça'89 will participate in the first qualifying round of the 2017–18 UEFA Champions League, the first team from Kosovo to participate in the competition.

Teams and stadiums

Istogu and Vushtrria were relegated after finishing the previous season in eleventh and twelfth-place respectively. They were replaced by the champions and runners-up of the 2015–16 Liga e Parë, Trepça and Ferizaj respectively.
Note: Table lists in alphabetical order.

Source: Scoresway

League table

Results
Each team plays three times against every other team, either twice at home and once away or once at home and twice away, for a total of 33 matches played each.

Matches 1–22

Matches 23–33

Relegation play-offs
The ninth and tenth-placed teams, Drita and Ferizaj respectively, each paired off against the third and fourth-placed teams from the 2016–17 First Football League of Kosovo season, Vllaznia and Dukagjini respectively; the two winners will play in the top-flight next season. As with previous seasons, both play-offs were played on neutral ground.

Vllaznia were promoted to 2017–18 Football Superleague of Kosovo; Ferizaj were relegated to 2017–18 First Football League of Kosovo.

Drita retained their spot in 2017–18 Football Superleague of Kosovo; Dukagjini remained in 2017–18 First Football League of Kosovo.

Season statistics

Top scorers

Notes and references

Notes

References

External links
 
 Kosovo Superliga at Borozani

Football Superleague of Kosovo seasons
Kosovo
1